Aadhaaram is a 1992 Malayalam-language drama film directed by George Kithu, written by Lohithadas. The film stars Murali as Bapputty, who is trying to rebuild life after completing his prison sentence. The film also features Suresh Gopi, Geetha, and Sudheesh in supporting roles.

Plot
Bapputty is a convict who is released from jail after serving his sentence. The film tells the story of his attempts to build back his life and his accidental interference in the family affairs of Rameshan and his sister Sethulakshmi.

Cast

Murali as Bapputty
Suresh Gopi as Vasu
Geetha as Sethulakshmi
Usha as Shayida
Sudheesh as Rameshan
Janardhanan as Krishna Menon
Sukumari as Naniyamma
Shari as Amina
Mamukkoya as Kunjappu
V. K. Sreeraman as Musaliyar
Beena Antony as Sreedevi Menon
Karamana Janardhanan Nair as Abdullah
Sankaradi as Kesavan Nair
Poojappura Ravi as Shankaran Nair
Subair as Kunjalikutty
Remyasree as Bhanumathy
Indrans as Dinakaran
Aboobacker as Kuttan Nair
Jose Pellissery as Laser
Sivaji as Yacob
Manju Satheesh as dancer
Salim Bava as Keerikadan Thomas

Soundtrack

Awards
 Best dubbing artist: Anandavally
 Best actor: Murali
 Kerala State Film Award for Best Debut Director: George Kittu
 Filmfare Award for Best Actress – Malayalam - Geetha (actress)

References

External links
 
 Aadhaaram at the Malayalam Movie Database

1990s Malayalam-language films
1992 films
1992 drama films
Films with screenplays by A. K. Lohithadas
Films scored by Johnson
Indian drama films